Central Illinois is a region of the U.S. state of Illinois that consists of the entire central third of the state, divided from north to south. Also known as the Heart of Illinois, it is characterized by small towns and mid-sized cities. Agriculture, particularly corn and soybeans, as well as educational institutions and manufacturing centers, figure prominently. Major cities include Peoria, Springfield (the state capital), Decatur, Quincy, Champaign–Urbana, Bloomington–Normal, Galesburg, and Danville.

Geography 

Historically prairie, Central Illinois is generally flat and includes Douglas County, the state's flattest. The region also hosts a variety of man-made lakes, including Lake Shelbyville, Lake Springfield, Clinton Lake and Lake Decatur. Major rivers in the region include the Illinois, Middle Fork of the Vermilion, Kaskaskia, Sangamon and Mississippi rivers.

Protected areas 
Central Illinois is home to many protected areas, many related to Abraham Lincoln.  The Lincoln's New Salem State Historic Site showcases the town where Lincoln started his life as a politician. The Lincoln Home National Historic Site operated by the National Park Service is a national park featuring Lincoln's Springfield home. Chautauqua National Wildlife Refuge is a protected area where thousands of waterfowl and shorebirds live. There are many other state parks and National Wildlife Refuges in the region.

Climate 

The climate of central Illinois is humid continental and the area experiences all four seasons. Snow is common in the winter months and while the counties vary in snowfall rate, most receive about twenty inches of snow annually. With all precipitation combined, most counties receive about 38 inches of rain and snow annually. Severe weather, including tornadoes, is common during the spring and summer months. Rare blizzards can happen in parts of central Illinois in winter. The weather of central Illinois affects the crop season as well; droughts can sometimes happen in the summer and fall causing harm to the soybean and corn crops.

Economy 

Central Illinois has a diverse economy consisting of a variety of industries. Agriculture is the most significant industry in the region and ranges in scope from family farms to mass-production farms. Most counties in Central Illinois have an agriculture-based economy. The most common crops are soybeans and corn. County fairs and the Illinois State Fair help to promote agriculture in the region and also offer entertainment. The manufacturing and service industries are also significant. Caterpillar Inc. employs more than 15,000 workers in the region and was formerly headquartered in Peoria. Major insurance provider State Farm Insurance is headquartered in Bloomington. The Illinois government in Springfield is also a major employer of people in the region. Popular tourist sites include the Lincoln Home National Historic Site, the Old State Capitol, and the Abraham Lincoln Presidential Library and Museum. Military makes up a smaller part of the economy, but was much larger until the closing Chanute Air Force Base in 1993.

Culture 
Central Illinois is culturally and demographically similar to a lot of the Rust Belt. The southern side has the more conservative Southern Illinois area, while the northern side has the Chicago metropolitan area. The area is also at the heart of one the most famous rivalries in American sports, the Cardinals-Cubs rivalry.

Transportation 
Transportation in central Illinois is provided by an assortment of airports, railroads, interstate highways, bus networks and the rivers. Airports with commercial service in the region include Central Illinois Regional Airport (serving Bloomington-Normal), General Wayne Downing Peoria International Airport (serving the Peoria area), Abraham Lincoln Capital Airport in Springfield, University of Illinois Willard Airport south of Savoy, Decatur Airport, and Baldwin Field in Quincy. Multiple Amtrak lines run through the region with stops in major regional cities. The most common mode of travel is on the many expressways, that cross the region. There are nine interstate highways located in central Illinois, six of which are primary.

Interstates

Education

Colleges

Universities

Trade and specialty schools

See also 

 Northern Illinois
 Southern Illinois
 National Weather Service Lincoln, Illinois

References

External links 
 Commercial website focusing on Central Illinois

Regions of Illinois